Five Minutes to Love (originally known as The Rotten Apple and It Only Takes Five Minutes) is a 1963 American drama film directed by John Hayes and starring Rue McClanahan as Poochie, a woman who lives in a junkyard. The film was critically lambasted, and later picked up by exploitation filmmaker Kroger Babb.

Plot

Cast
Rue McClanahan as Sally "Poochie"
King Moody as Blowhard
Will Gregory as Ben
Gaye Gordon as Edna
Norman Hartweg
Michael De Carlo
William Guhl
Paul Leder as Harry
Ethlyn De Carlo
Geraldine Leder as Ben and Edna's Daughter

Soundtrack

DVD release
The film was released in 2006 as a double feature with Walk the Angry Beach under its exploitation title Hollywood After Dark, focusing on McClanahan's roles, as she later gained fame for her work on The Golden Girls.

External links

1963 films
American drama films
1963 drama films
American black-and-white films
1960s English-language films
Films directed by John Hayes
1960s American films